Tuesday is the first studio album by the pop rock band Reamonn. It was released in 2000 on EMI and Virgin Records. The album was produced by Steve Lyon, and was certified gold in Germany.

Promotion
The first single from the album was "Supergirl". It was certified Gold in Germany, and became the most-played song on German radio in 2000. Reamonn became stars and played at many festivals and concerts. In the latter half of 2000, they went on their own tour to promote the album with support from Heyday. The next singles, "Josephine" and "Waiting There for You", achieved similar success.

Track listing

Charts and certifications

Weekly charts

Year-end charts

Certifications

References

External links
 Reamonn: Wish at Last.fm
 Reamonns Official English Website

2000 debut albums
Reamonn albums